Buzz Bingo is a chain of bingo clubs in Great Britain owned by Caledonia Investments. It has 92 locations. Formerly operating as Gala Bingo clubs, they were re-branded as Buzz Bingo clubs in September 2018, whilst the Gala brand continues to run its own online bingo and casino offerings under the ownership of Entain plc.

History

Buzz Bingo has undergone several changes in ownership and branding including through acquisitions. They were originally Coral branded, a division of Bass plc. In 1983, there were 22 clubs and 24 located in their Pontins holiday camps.

The ownership acquisitions included a chain of 80 bingo clubs from Thorn EMI for £18.2 million in 1983, followed by another 30 by purchasing Zetters Leisure for £23 million in 1988. Granada plc's chain of 74 bingo clubs were added in 1991 for £147 million. This merger with Granada led to the company rebranding as Gala Clubs later that year. Gala was officially launched on 17 October 1991 when 17 clubs re-branded and launched a new image. There followed a series of further acquisitions under the Gala brand, including 17 clubs from Ritz in July 1998, 10 clubs from Jarglen in March 2000 and 27 Riva Bingo Clubs from First Leisure for £90 million in April 2000.

Towards the end of 2000, Gala then began a series of expansions outside of their bingo operations, with casinos from the Hilton Group in December 2000 and the Jamba Online business in 2001. This was later followed by a series of private equity sales of the company starting in February 2003 to the private equity firms Candover and Cinven. Permira bought a stake in the company in August 2005, which valued the business at £1.89 billion. In October 2005, Gala acquired Coral Eurobet for £2.18 billion and changed its name to Gala Coral Group, creating the United Kingdom's third largest bookmaker and largest bingo operator.

By 2015, Gala Coral was acquired by its rival Ladbrokes, but the Gala Bingo clubs were not part of the merger, and were subsequently sold to Caledonia Investments for £241 million in December 2015. This meant that the clubs used the Gala brand under licence from the Ladbrokes-Coral group and decided during 2018 to re-brand as Buzz Bingo.

Operations 
Buzz Bingo now operates all the clubs previously on the High Street as Gala Bingo and launched its own online bingo, buzzbingo.com offering shortly after the rebrand was completed.

References

External links 
Buzzbingo.com

Bingo
Gambling companies of the United Kingdom
Online gambling companies of the United Kingdom
Gambling companies established in 2018
2018 establishments in the United Kingdom